Flynt L. Leverett (born March 6, 1958 in Memphis, Tennessee) is a former senior fellow at the New America Foundation in Washington, D.C. and a professor at the Pennsylvania State University School of International Affairs. From March 2002 to March 2003, he served as the senior director for Middle East affairs on the National Security Council (NSC).

Prior to serving on the NSC, he was a counterterrorism expert on the Policy Planning Staff of the U.S. State Department, and before that he served as a CIA senior analyst for eight years. Since leaving government service, Leverett served as a visiting fellow at the Brookings Institution's Saban Center for Middle East Policy before becoming the director of the Geopolitics of Energy Initiative in the American Strategy Program at the New America Foundation.

Professional life
Professor Leverett graduated with the degrees of B.A., B.M., from Texas Christian University and went on to earn M.A. and Ph.D. degrees from Princeton University. His areas of professional expertise include U.S. Middle East and Persian Gulf policy, international energy affairs, and international security. He is a founding faculty member of the School of International Affairs of Pennsylvania State University. He has testified before Congress, and has appeared on numerous major television news-oriented broadcasts.

Views on Iran
Leverett was heavily criticized for his articles during the 2009 Iranian Green Movement protests. After the government announced official election results, millions of Iranians took on the streets in a peaceful protest against the rigged presidential election. The demonstrations were brutally crushed by the Iranian regime's security forces that left hundreds dead, and thousands of dissidents were injured, arrested and tortured. In a New York Times op-ed co-authored with his wife Hillary Mann Leverett, Flynt described the Iranian opposition movement as weak and not representing "anything close to a majority." The piece then went on to criticize President Obama's Iran policy as "half-hearted efforts." The Leveretts' op-ed was harshly criticized by Abbas Milani. Calling the Leveretts' op-ed "the most infuriating op-ed of the new year," Milani pointed out how Obama's extensive efforts to reach out to the Ayatollah had been rejected and ridiculed by the regime. In a 2010 article in the Atlantic, Jeffrey Goldberg described the Leveretts as "cynical foreign policy realists," and criticized their reasons for a policy of conciliation between the US and a "regime that rapes and murders its own citizens" as "semi-inexplicable."

Op-ed controversy
As a former national security official granted a security clearance, Leverett is required to seek prior approval of articles from the CIA's Publication Review Board.  Such reviews are conducted as a precaution to prevent leaks of classified information.

On December 16, 2006 Leverett was denied permission to publish a 1,000 word opinion piece, co-written with his wife, Hillary Mann and based on his previously approved 35 page paper "Dealing with Tehran: Assessing U.S. Diplomatic Options Toward Iran." The longer paper and its shorter piece are critical of the George W. Bush administration's refusal to engage in "comprehensive" negotiations with the government of Iran.

Leverett had intended to publish the shorter article in The New York Times. In a statement to the online publication Talking Points Memo, he disputed the official justification for the decision.

In the same statement, Leverett places the blame for quashing the op-ed piece on

White House staffers... working for Elliott Abrams and Meghan O'Sullivan, both politically appointed deputies to President Bush's National Security Advisor Stephen Hadley.

Bibliography

Books and reports

Essays

Video

References

External links
Profile at New America Foundation
Bush Administration Guilty of Strategic Malpractice - Expert
How Bush Bungled The War on Terror? Flynt Leverett in Democracy Now
Biography at New American Foundation
Publications on the Brookings Institution Website by Flynt L. Leverett
The Story of Leverett and Mann by Our World in Balance
Video (with mp3 available) of conversation with Leverett and David Frum on Bloggingheads.tv
 Flynt Leverett interviewed on Conversations from Penn State
 

People of the Central Intelligence Agency
United States Department of State officials
Living people
American male writers
1958 births
Pennsylvania State University faculty
United States National Security Council staffers